Pardirallus is a genus of bird in the family Rallidae. It contains three species native to marshland areas of Southern, Central America and the Caribbean, although fossil evidence indicates they once ranged north to what is now Idaho. They are 25–38 cm long and have a long greenish bill and reddish legs. The spotted rail is blackish-brown with white markings while the other two are brown above and dark grey below.

The genus Pardirallus was erected by the French naturalist Charles Lucien Bonaparte in 1856 with the spotted rail (Pardirallus maculatus) as the type species. The generic name combines the Ancient Greek pardos meaning "leopard" with the genus Rallus.

Species
The genus contains three species :

A fossil species, Pardirallus lacustris, is known from the Late Pliocene of the Hagerman Fossil Beds of Idaho. It was formerly assigned to the genus Porzana upon its description in 1958 by Pierce Brodkorb and later to the genus Rallus in 1968 by Alan Feduccia, but an analysis by Storrs L. Olson in 1977 transferred it to Pardirallus.

References

External links

 
Bird genera
Higher-level bird taxa restricted to the Neotropics
Taxa named by Charles Lucien Bonaparte
Taxonomy articles created by Polbot
Extant Piacenzian first appearances